Cochylimorpha nankinensis is a species of moth of the family Tortricidae. It is found in China (Guangxi, Henan, Hong Kong, Hubei, Jiangsu, Shaanxi, Tianjin, Zhejiang) and Korea.

References

Moths described in 1964
Cochylimorpha
Taxa named by Józef Razowski
Moths of Asia
Moths of Korea